Eulepidotis teligera is a moth of the family Erebidae first described by E. Brabant in 1910. It is found in the Neotropics, including Peru, Venezuela and Paraguay.

References

Moths described in 1910
teligera